Swing Your Partner is a 1943 American comedy film directed by Frank McDonald and written by Dorrell McGowan and Stuart E. McGowan. The film stars Myrtle Wiseman, Scotty Wiseman, Barbara Jo Allen, Dale Evans, Ransom M. Sherman and Harry Cheshire. The film was released on May 20, 1943, by Republic Pictures.

Plot

Cast    
Myrtle Wiseman as Lulubelle 
Scotty Wiseman as Scotty 
Barbara Jo Allen as Vera Vague 
Dale Evans as Dale Evans
Ransom M. Sherman as Ransom Sherman 
Harry Cheshire as Harry 'Pappy' Cheshire
Richard Lane as Mr. Lane
Shug Fisher as Shug 
The Tennessee Ramblers as Tennessee Ramblers Band
Roger Clark as Johnny Murphy
Esther Dale as Caroline Bird, aka Anna Robbins
Judy Clark as Judy
Charles Judels as Digby
Rosemary La Planche as Secretary
Sam Flint as Teal
Forbes Murray as Morningside
Elmer Jerome as Duffy
Peppy as Specialty Act
Peanuts as Specialty Act

References

External links
 

1943 films
American comedy films
1943 comedy films
Republic Pictures films
Films directed by Frank McDonald
American black-and-white films
1940s English-language films
1940s American films